The following is list of awards and nominations received by American actor Jonah Hill. Hill is known for his comedic roles in films such as Accepted (2006), Superbad (2007), Knocked Up (2007), 21 Jump Street (2012), This Is the End (2013), and 22 Jump Street (2014), as well as his performances in Bennett Miller's sports drama Moneyball (2011) and Martin Scorsese's crime satire The Wolf of Wall Street (2013), for each of which he received an Academy Award nomination for Best Supporting Actor. On Monday December 12, 2016, during an NBC presentation, Hill received a Golden Globes nomination for his role in 
War Dogs (2016).

Major associations

Academy Awards

British Academy Film Awards

Golden Globe Awards

Screen Actors Guild Awards

Critics awards

Dallas–Fort Worth Film Critics Awards

Iowa Film Critics Awards

San Diego Film Critics Society Awards

Saint Louis Gateway Film Critics Awards

Miscellaneous awards

MTV Movie Awards

Palm Springs International Film Festival

Satellite Awards

Teen Choice Awards

Young Hollywood Awards

Online awards

Awards Circuit Community Awards

Gold Derby Awards

Notes

References 

Hill, Jonah